The Karlskrona Admiralty Church is a church in Karlskrona, Sweden. The church is also known as the Ulrica Pia in honor of  Queen Ulrike Eleonora of Denmark, Queen consort of  King Charles XI of Sweden ('pia' is the feminine form of the Latin 'pius' which means 'pious').

History
The church  belongs to the Royal Karlskrona Admiralty Parish and is situated close to the Karlskrona naval base shipyard area. It is located near Vallgatan in the south east of the island of Trossö in the Karlskrona archipelago.

The church was consecrated in 1685. It is made entirely of wood. Originally it could seat 4,000 making it Sweden's largest wooden church
The interior is in a light bluish color while the exterior is in the traditional Falu red. In front of the main entrance stands the wooden figure of Rosenbom. 

The church was listed as part of the Karlskrona naval base on the UNESCO World Heritage List in 1998.

Gallery

See also
Trinity Church (Karlskrona)

References

External links

 Amiralitetskyrkan at the Swedish Fortifications Agency

17th-century Church of Sweden church buildings
Karlskrona
Churches in Blekinge County
Churches in the Diocese of Lund